Upson is a surname.  Notable people with the surname include:

 Arthur Upson, American poet
 Charles Upson, U.S. Representative from Michigan
 Christopher C. Upson, U.S. Representative from Texas
Devonte Upson (born 1993), American basketball player in the Israeli Basketball Premier League
 Donna Upson, Canadian white supremacist
 Jill Upson, American politician
 Matthew Upson, English football player
 Maxwell Upson, trustee of Cornell University
 Nicola Upson (born 1970), British novelist
 Ralph Hazlett Upson, American balloonist
 Stephen Upson, American politician and lawyer
 William Hazlett Upson, American author